The individual dressage event was one of six equestrian events on the Equestrian at the 1984 Summer Olympics programme. The competition was held at the Santa Anita Racetrack in Arcadia, California.

The competition was split into two phases:

Qualifying round (8–9 August)
Riders performed the Grand Prix test. The twelve riders with the highest scores advanced to the final.
Final (10 August)
Riders performed the Grand Prix Special test.

Results

References

External links
1984 Summer Olympics official report Volume 2, Part 2. p. 381. 

Individual dressage